Galapagos: Beyond Darwin is a 1996 documentary narrated by actor Roscoe Lee Browne. It premiered on the Discovery Channel on Sunday, August 18, 1996.  It was directed by Al Giddings.

Synopsis
Actor Roscoe Lee Browne narrates this Discovery Channel program that takes viewers 3,000 feet below the surface of the ocean near the Galapagos Islands. Located off the Ecuadorian coast of South America, this area was first visited by British biologist Charles Darwin in 1835. His discovery of many new species and organisms thriving on the islands brought this area international acclaim. Unfortunately, since sophisticated submersibles didn't exist in Darwin's day, he was prevented from journeying far beneath the surrounding waters. As this program indicates, today's submersibles allow scientists to spend extended time periods beneath the ocean's surface. The deep ocean journey featured during this program turned up dozens of new species. In fact, the scientists even captured some of the creatures so they could more fully study and classify them.

References

External links

1996 documentary films
1996 films
American documentary television films
Documentary films about nature
1996 television films
1990s American films